Thomas Armitt (1 April 1904 – 15 October 1972) was an English professional rugby league footballer who played in the 1930s and 1940s. In 1926 he played one match as centre-half in the Football League Third Division North for Accrington Stanley F.C.

Background
Tommy Armitt's birth was registered in Salford, Lancashire, England, and he died aged 68 in Salford, Lancashire, England.

Playing career

International honours
Tommy Armitt won caps for England while at Swinton in 1935 against France and Wales, in 1936 against Wales (two matches) and France, in 1937 against France, in 1938 against Wales (two matches) and France, and in 1939 against Wales, and won caps for Great Britain while at Swinton in 1933 against Australia, in 1936 against Australia (two matches), and New Zealand (two matches), and in 1937 against Australia (three matches).

County honours
Tommy Armitt played  in Lancashire's 7-5 victory over Australia in the 1937–38 Kangaroo tour of Great Britain and France match at Wilderspool Stadium, Warrington on Wednesday 29 September 1937, in front of a crowd of 16,250.

Genealogical information
Tommy Armitt was the father of the rugby league footballer; Charlie Armitt.

References

External links
(archived by web.archive.org) Stats → Past Players → A at hullfc.com
(archived by web.archive.org) Statistics at hullfc.com

1904 births
1972 deaths
England national rugby league team players
English rugby league players
Great Britain national rugby league team players
Hull F.C. players
Lancashire rugby league team players
Rugby league players from Salford
Rugby league hookers
Swinton Lions players
Accrington Stanley F.C. (1891) players
English footballers
Association football midfielders